The East Wind was a summer passenger train between Washington, D.C., and resorts along the southern Maine coast. Travel time was about 14 hours over the  route to Portland, Maine. The route was over the Pennsylvania Railroad from Washington through Philadelphia to New York City, then the New Haven Railroad to Groton, Connecticut, where it left the Northeast Corridor to reach the Boston and Maine Railroad at Worcester, Massachusetts, whereby it continued northeastward, bypassing Boston. The train continued over the Boston & Maine to Portland, where a coach and diner continued to Bangor, Maine, on the connecting Pine Tree Limited. In contrast to the other Mid-Atlantic to Maine trains, it was the only day and evening train.

History
Service started in June 1940 with two sets of pooled passenger cars painted yellow with a silver window band and pinstripes. Each train had an arch-roof baggage car, a dining car, and as many as eight lightweight coaches. The New Haven and Boston & Maine provided American Flyer coaches built in the 1930s by the Pullman Company's former Osgood Bradley Car Company plant in Worcester. The New Haven provided a similar grill car, while the Pennsylvania Railroad provided P-70 coaches and a lounge car.  The train did not run during the summers of 1943, 1944 and 1945. 

Service resumed in the summer of 1946 without the distinctive paint scheme of the earlier years. Instead of turning north at Groton on the Norwich Branch, the train now passed through Providence, Rhode Island, and used the Providence and Worcester Railroad to reach Worcester. From 1953 to 1955, the train ran via Hartford, Willimantic, and Putnam. Dining cars were sometimes leased from the Atlantic Coast Line Railroad, or Boston and Maine or New Haven heavyweight diners were used. The New Haven diners were sometimes painted silver. The train ran for the last time in the summer of 1955.

Guilford Rail System used the name East Wind in 1995 for a through piggyback service of semi-trailers on flatcars between Springfield, Massachusetts, and Bangor, Maine.

References

Boston and Maine Railroad
Passenger trains of the Boston and Maine Railroad
Passenger trains of the New York, New Haven and Hartford Railroad
Passenger trains of the Pennsylvania Railroad
Named passenger trains of the United States
Night trains of the United States
Passenger rail transportation in Massachusetts
Passenger rail transportation in New Hampshire
Passenger rail transportation in Maine
Passenger rail transportation in New York (state)
Passenger rail transportation in Connecticut
Passenger rail transportation in Maryland
Passenger rail transportation in Pennsylvania
Railway services introduced in 1940
Railway services discontinued in 1955